The First Crusade is a combination of live performances, video clips, interviews, etc., by Swedish Power metal band HammerFall. It was released in Nuclear Blast, first on VHS (9 August 1999) followed by a DVD release (2 February 2000).

Track listing
 Introduction		
 "Steel Meets Steel"
 "Glory To The Brave"
 "HammerFall"
 Introducing: Magnus Rosen		
 "Steel Meets Steel"
 "Glory To The Brave"
 "The Making Of Glory To The Brave"		
 "Ravenlord" (Stormwitch cover)
 "The Metal Age"
 Nominated For The Swedish Grammy Award
 "Stone Cold"
 "Listening Session"
 "German TV Advertisement"
 "Releaseparty For Legacy Of Kings"
 "Head Over Heels"
 "Balls to the Wall" (Accept cover)
 "Breaking The Law" (Judas Priest cover)
 Outtakes and Sign Off

Personnel
 Joacim Cans – Lead and Backing Vocals
 Oscar Dronjak – Guitar and Backing Vocals
 Stefan Elmgren – Guitar
 Magnus Rosén – Bass Guitar
 Patrik Räfling – Drums

Information
Tracks 1, 5, 13, 15 and in-between-segments skits filmed and directed by Roger Johansson.
Track 2 recorded live at Flunsåsparken, Gothenburg, Sweden, May 11, 1996.
Track 3, 4 produced, filmed and directed by Alfonso Ågren.
Track 6 recorded live at Down Under, Gothenburg, Sweden, June 27, 1997. Filmed by Parick Nordqvist.
Track 7 and 8 produced by Roxanne Film, directed by Thomas Wolff.
Track 9 recorded live at Bang Your Head II, Stefan Hartmannhalle, Tübingen, Germany, September 14, 1997.
Track 10 recorded live at Musikens Hus, Gothenburg, Sweden, January 30, 1998. Filmed and directed by Roger Johansson.
Track 12 recorded live at Dynamo Open Air, Endhoven, Holland, May 30, 1998. Produced by Van Wingarden Produktion, directed by Thomas Wolff.
Tracks 16-19 recorded live at Kåren, Göteborg Sweden, September 19, 1998. Filmed and directed by Roger Johansson.
Track 20 taken from Metal Warriors video magazine, Australia.

Additional information
Track 2: featuring Jesper Strömblad, Fredrik Larsson and Glenn Ljungström.
Track 9: featuring Andy Mück.
Track 16: featuring Udo Dirkschneider.
Track 17: featuring Udo Dirkschneider and Mikkey Dee.

References

HammerFall video albums
1999 video albums
1999 compilation albums
1999 live albums
Live video albums
Music video compilation albums
Nuclear Blast compilation albums
Nuclear Blast video albums
Nuclear Blast live albums